Synod of the Pacific is an upper judicatory of the Presbyterian Church (USA) including northern and central California, Oregon, Nevada, southern Idaho, and part of Washington state.

The Synod contains 11 presbyteries, 464 churches, 20 new church developments, and 114,210 (43,512 in 2021) members.

Presbyteries of the Synod of the Pacific 

 Boise
 Cascades
 Eastern Oregon
 Kendall
 The Redwoods
 San Francisco
 San Joaquin
 San Jose
 Sierra Mission Partnership*
 Nevada
 Sacramento
 Stockton
 Snake River Mission Area*
 Boise
 Eastern Oregon
 Kendall

The presbyteries contained by the Sierra Mission Partnership and the Snake River Mission Area join together in their mission because of their remote nature. They remain separate presbyteries while being a part of the mission partnership.

External links 

See also: Synod of the Pacific the Synod website

References 

Presbyterianism in the United States
Presbyterian Church (USA)
Presbyterian synods